Charles Emmett Cassell (April 26, 1838 – August 29, 1916) was a Baltimore, Maryland-based architect.

Biography 
He was born in Portsmouth, Virginia and trained as a naval architect. He received a degree in engineering from the University of Virginia at age 15. During the Civil War he served as a captain in the engineers corps, under General George Pickett of the Confederate States Army. After the war, he traveled to South America and served in the Chilean Navy. He returned to the United States and practiced architecture in St. Louis, Missouri before coming to Baltimore about 1868. He was a founding member of the Baltimore Chapter of the American Institute of Architects in 1870. He was known for his Romanesque Revival architecture style. He became an AIA fellow in 1905. In 1905 he had established Charles E. Cassell & Son in Baltimore, Maryland. His son John Cassell, died in 1909 from influenza. Following this, he occasionally associated with his nephew in Norfolk, Virginia under the office name of Cassell & Cassell. He is buried in his family’s lot at Cedar Grove Cemetery in Portsmouth, Virginia.

Selected works

 The naval waterworks at Old Point Comfort, Virginia
 Country house for Albert Hutzler
 Holy Trinity Episcopal Church, listed on the National Register of Historic Places in 1992, as a contributing building in the Onancock Historic District, Onancock, Virginia. 
 1881: Immanuel Chapel, Virginia Theological Seminary
 1883: Christ Episcopal Church and Cemetery (Cambridge, Maryland), listed on the National Register of Historic Places in 1984. 
 1885: The Chapel, University of Virginia
 1894: Davis Memorial Presbyterian Church, Elkins, West Virginia, listed on the National Register of Historic Places in 1984.
 1894: The Stafford Hotel in Baltimore
 1899: Stewart's Department Store, Baltimore, Maryland, listed on the National Register of Historic Places in 1999.
 1904: Chamber of Commerce Building (Baltimore, Maryland), listed on the National Register of Historic Places in 1983.
 1911: First Church of Christ, Scientist (Baltimore, Maryland), listed on the National Register of Historic Places in 1982.

References

External links

Brexton Renaissance, biography of Charles E. Cassell

1842 births
1916 deaths
19th-century American architects
Architects from Baltimore
University of Virginia School of Engineering and Applied Science alumni
People from Portsmouth, Virginia
Romanesque Revival architects